The Bang on a Can All-Stars is an amplified ensemble that was formed in 1992 by parent organization Bang on a Can.

Called "a flexible and expert sextet" by The New York Times, the ensemble was formed as an agile group with a set instrumentation to take on touring and recording projects for Bang on a Can that would not be feasible for the organization's massive "Marathon" concert productions.

They appeared as guest stars in the season 17 episode of Arthur, "Binky's Music Madness", with Evan Ziporyn and Julia Wolfe as themselves.

Awards and recognition

In 2005 the All-Stars were named "Ensemble of the Year" by the Musical America International Directory of the Performing Arts. The ensemble has been heralded as "the country's most important vehicle for contemporary music" by the San Francisco Chronicle.

The very first release of the Cantaloupe Music catalog, the All-Stars' Renegade Heaven was ranked the #1 album of 2001 by New York Times classical music editor Allan Kozinn, and their recording of Terry Riley's In C made the 2001 New York Times top ten lists in both classical and pop.

Discography 

 Bang on a Can Live, volume 1 (1992)
 Bang on a Can Live, volume 2 (1993)
 Bang on a Can Live, volume 3 (1994)
 Industry (1995)
 Cheating, Lying, Stealing (1996)
 Lost Objects (1997)
 Music for Airports (composed by Brian Eno) (1998)
 Renegade Heaven (2001)
 In C (composed by Terry Riley) (2001)
 Bang on a Can Classics (2002)
 Gigantic Dancing Human Machine (music of Louis Andriessen) (2003)
 ShadowBang (composed by Evan Ziporyn) (2003)
 Music in Fifths / Two Pages (composed by Philip Glass) (2004)
 Bang on a Can Meets Kyaw Kyaw Naing (2004)
 Elida (composer and guest musician Iva Bittová) (2005)
 A Ballad for Many (composer and guest musician Don Byron) (2006)
 The Essential Martin Bresnick (2006)
 The Carbon Copy Building (2007)
 Music for Airports (Live) (2008)
 Music from the Film (Untitled) (2009)
 Double Sextet / 2x5 (music of Steve Reich) (2010)
 Big Beautiful Dark and Scary (2012)
 Shelter (Ensemble Signal) (2013)
 Field Recordings (2015)

References 

Contemporary classical music ensembles
Musical groups established in 1992
Musical groups from New York City